Cape San Antonio, or in Spanish Cabo San Antonio, may refer to:

Cape San Antonio, Argentina
Cape San Antonio, Cuba
Cape San Antonio, Spain